USS Hollandia (CVE-97) was a  of the United States Navy. She was named after the Battle of Hollandia, a successful amphibious operation during the New Guinea campaign. Launched in April 1944, and commissioned in June, she served in support of the Battle of Okinawa. Postwar, she participated in Operation Magic Carpet. She was decommissioned in January 1947, when she was mothballed in the Pacific Reserve Fleet. Ultimately, she was sold for scrapping in December 1960.

Design and description

Hollandia was a Casablanca-class escort carrier, the most numerous type of aircraft carrier ever built, and designed specifically to be mass-produced using prefabricated sections, in order to replace heavy early war losses. She displaced  standard,  with a full load. She was powered with two Skinner Unaflow reciprocating steam engines, which drove two shafts, providing , thus enabling her to make . Her compact size necessitated the installment of an aircraft catapult at her bow, and there were two aircraft elevators to facilitate movement of aircraft between the flight and hangar deck: one each fore and aft.

One /38 caliber dual-purpose gun was mounted on the stern. Anti-aircraft defense was provided by 8 Bofors  anti-aircraft guns in single mounts, as well as 12 Oerlikon  cannons, which were mounted around the perimeter of the deck. By the end of the war, Casablanca-class carriers had been modified to carry thirty 20–mm cannons, and the amount of 40–mm guns had been doubled to sixteen, by putting them into twin mounts. These modifications were in response to increasing casualties due to kamikaze attacks. Casablanca-class escort carriers were designed to carry 27 aircraft, but the hangar deck could accommodate more.

Construction
The escort carrier was laid down on 12 February 1944, under a Maritime Commission contract, MC hull 1134, by Kaiser Shipbuilding Company, Vancouver, Washington. She was laid down and launched under the name Astrolabe Bay, as part of a tradition which named escort carriers after bays or sounds in Alaska. She was renamed Hollandia on 30 May 1944, as part of a new naval policy which named subsequent Casablanca-class carriers after naval or land engagements. She was launched on 28 April 1944; sponsored by Mrs. William H. Wheat; transferred to the United States Navy and commissioned on 1 June 1944, with Captain Charles Loomis Lee in command.

Service history

Upon being commissioned, Hollandia underwent a shakedown cruise down the West Coast to San Diego. Shakedown continued as she underwent a transport mission, carrying a load of replacement aircraft and military personnel. She departed on 10 July, bound for Espiritu Santo. On her return trip, she stopped at Manus and Guadalcanal, before arriving at Port Hueneme, California on 27 August. For the next few months, Hollandia continued these transport missions to the West and South Pacific, transporting supplies and passengers.

She continued these duties until 1 April 1945, at which point she was anchored at Ulithi. As U.S. forces began their landings, beginning the Battle of Okinawa, Hollandia joined the Special Escort Carrier Group as its flagship.
 , transported Marine Air Groups 31 and 33 to land bases captured on Okinawa. In total, the air group being transported consisted of 192 Vought F4U Corsair and 30 Grumman F6F Hellcat fighters. Hollandia was delegated to take on the planes of Marine Air Group 33.

The escort carriers managed to safely arrive at Okinawa on 6 April, although the destroyers dropped depth charges to deter a suspected submarine en route. There, Hollandia prepared to begin launching her aircraft, which would be the first land-based aircraft to support the U.S. forces fighting their way down the island. However, she, along with White Plains, were ordered to postpone their launchings for several days, as the transport ships ferrying the equipment of the marines had been attacked and damaged, with much equipment lost. On 9 April, she launched her planes to the hastily expanded Kadena Air Base, where the aircraft began operations. Marine Fighter Attack Squadron 323, transported aboard the escort carriers, would go on to become the highest-scoring air unit participating in the Battle of Okinawa, claiming 124.5 Japanese planes.

Having completed her duties, she returned to San Diego, arriving on 1 May. Whilst at port, Captain John Thompson Brown, Jr. took over command of the vessel. She then conducted a transport run to Pearl Harbor, ferrying cargo and passengers. On 7 June, she departed the West Coast to serve as a replenishment carrier, supporting the Fast Carrier Task Force in its operations against Japan. Replenishment carriers enabled the frontline carriers to replace battle losses, and to stay at sea for longer durations of time. Hollandia loaded replacement aircraft at Pearl Harbor, and she sailed on 18 June to join Task Group 30.8, the Fleet Oiler and Transport Carrier Group (also known as the At Sea Logistics Service Group). She provided replacement aircraft up until news of the Japanese surrender broke.

Post-war, Hollandia berthed at Guam, where overhaul was conducted to transform her into a passenger ship. She then joined the Operation Magic Carpet fleet, which repatriated U.S. servicemen from around the Pacific. She conducted four Magic Carpet runs, before heading to San Pedro, where she was released from the Magic Carpet fleet. She departed Southern California on 4 February 1946, bound for Puget Sound, and upon arriving on 15 February, she underwent inactivation. The ship was decommissioned on 17 January 1947, and mothballed as part of the Pacific Reserve Fleet. Whilst mothballed, she was redesignated as a utility aircraft carrier, CVU-97, on 12 June 1955. The hull was then once again redesignated, this time as an aircraft transport, AKV-33, on 7 May 1959. Finally, her hull struck from the Navy list on 1 April 1960, and sold sometime in July 1960 to Eisenberg & Co. of New York for scrapping. Her ultimate fate was to be broken up in Japan during November 1960.

References

Sources

Online sources

Bibliography

External links 

 

 

Casablanca-class escort carriers
World War II escort aircraft carriers of the United States
Ships built in Vancouver, Washington
1944 ships
S4-S2-BB3 ships